Long Lions Basketball Club (龙狮篮球俱乐部) may refer to:
 Guangzhou Long-Lions (Chinese Basketball Association)
 Eastern Sports Club (basketball), also known as Eastern Long Lions (ASEAN Basketball League)
 Macau Black Bears, formerly the Nanhai Long-Lions (ASEAN Basketball League)